Comedy Club is a Russian stand-up comedy TV show broadcast by the Russian TNT channel since April 23, 2005.

Long-time residents of the club are Garik Martirosyan, Timur Batrutdinov, Garik Kharlamov, Pavel Volya, Alexandr Revva, Marina Kravets and others. The show host is Garik Martirosyan.

Comedy Club headquarters is located in Moscow.

History 
Comedy Club was created in 2003 by the KVN team "New Armenians", which included Artur Janibekyan, Artak Gasparyan, Artur Tumasyan, Artashes Sargsyan, Garik Martirosyan and many others. The idea of the club appeared in 2001.

On television, Comedy Club made its debut on the eve of 2004 on MTV, but the cooperation with the channel did not advance beyond the filming of the New Year party, in June 2004, with the assistance of STS channel, producer Alexander Tsekalo, a pilot release of the show was filmed for $22,000, but the general director of the channel Alexander Rodnyansky considered that the show does not fit into the concept of STS channel, which was later perceived by the shareholders of the channel as a mistake Rodnyansky. April 23, 2005 Comedy Club first appeared on the air of the channel TNT. In 2007, the production company Comedy Club Production was created, which produces the same-name program.

Over time, new members and winners from the TV show Comedy Battle (2010-2016) began to appear in the club, from 2005 to 2014, residents appeared from KVN.

On April 15, 2007, the 100th issue of the program was shown on TNT. Regularly there are some special projects - for example, from 2006 to 2007 there were issues on Channel one, from 2011 summer humorous festivals from Sochi "Week of High Humor." In 2014, special issues were issued from Sochi, dedicated to the holding of the Russian stage of Formula 1 in this city, and in 2015 from Kazan, dedicated to the holding of the World Aquatics Championships in this city. In 2008, the television channel Comedy TV was created (later TNT-Comedy, then TNT4), which broadcast various programs of the television production company Comedy Club Production. In 2008, the animated studio Toonbox released the animated series The Real Adventures of Squirrels and Arrows according to the script of the participants of Comedy Club.

April 8, 2010, the presentation of the updated Comedy Club with the new director Sergey Shirokov, music and design took place. On a new stage, a permanent place was occupied by musical instruments - the piano and the drum set. In the center of the stage there is a blue sofa and two armchairs (in 2010-2014). The background is a large screen (in 2010-2011 it was a green background, in 2011-2014 it was light red, and since 2014 it has been dark red), which showed videos with the headings "Good evening, Mars!", "Preliminary caresses with Sergey Gorelikov", "Welcome to Russia with Yunusov and Likhnitsky", "Learning foreign languages with Demis Karibov", "Le Havre Upgrade", "Egor Batrudov's propaganda videos" and the "Mitrich" TV series. At the moment, only "USB" clips and some video clips are shown on the screen. From 2010 to 2014, artists, called "residents", went on stage, descending from the second floor on the escalator. Now they come out of the street, where people and stars meet them on stage. The musical accompaniment of the numbers, as well as paddles and jingles, is played live.

Roman Petrenko, CEO of TNT from 2002 to 2013, said about the new Comedy Club:

As you know, car companies every three to four years produce a new model, longer and sexier, which has a more powerful engine and a more beautiful exhaust pipe, and every five years, companies create a concept car. Comedy Club this year five years, we decided to keep up with the advanced car manufacturers and release our own concept car - the new Comedy Club.

April 1, 2011 - on the Day of Laughter - residents of the Comedy Club Andrei Averin, Timur Batrutdinov, Pavel Volya, Mikhail Galustyan, Garik Martirosyan, Alexander Nezlobin, Sergei Svetlakov, Semyon Slepakov and Garik Kharlamov were invited to a meeting with Russian President Dmitry Medvedev in his residence in Gorki.

In 2010-2011 and 2011-2012 in the New Year, the "Star of TNT in the Comedy Club" award was awarded, at which the best projects and actors of the TNT channel were awarded.

In 2012, a controlling stake in Comedy Club Production was sold to TNT for a record amount of $ 350 million.

Ukraine and Belarus 

Comedy Club has developed spin offs in Ukraine (Real Comedy), Belarus (Comedy Club Belarus), St Petersburg (Comedy Club Peter-style), Nizhny Novgorod  (Comedy Club Gorky Style), Rostov-on-Don (Comedy Club Rostov-style). The residents of the developed branches perform regularly in Moscow and some like "Elvis" from the Peter-style, the "Chekhov duet" from Ukraine are even shown on TNT channel. On April 29, 2007 in Comedy Club Moscow an African - Lubinda from the Rostov-style debuted signaling the internationalizing of Comedy Club.

Residents

Current 

 Garik Martirosyan - represents "residents" of the Comedy Club. In 2010-2015 he was the leading show. Since 2005.
 Pavel Volya - the current show host, performances in the genre Stand Up, miniatures, improvisation (usually in the course of communication with celebrities present in the hall). Since 2005.
 Garik Kharlamov - since March 14, 2015 co-host Pavel Volya in conversation with the invited stars, appears in miniatures, most often together with Timur Batrutdinov
 Timur Batrutdinov - miniatures (often with Garik Kharlamov). From January 16 to March 7, 2015, was co-host Will in a conversation with the stars. Characters: candidate for deputy Yegor Batrudov, Valery Alevdinovich Babushkin. Since 2005.
 Aleksandr Revva - miniatures. Characters: Arthur Pirozhkov, Don Digidon, grandmother, Super Stas, magician-illusionist. From 2005 to 2013, he returned to the program in 2015.
 Alexander Nezlobin - his own humorous monologue, sometimes miniatures. Also in 2010 he led the column "Good evening, Mars!" With Igor Meerson. Since September 13, 2006.
 Dmitry "Lusyok" Sorokin, Zurab Matua and Andrey Averin - musical sketches, musical experiments, former members of the group "Lips." Sorokin since 2005, Matua and Averin - since 2007.
 Marina Kravets - miniatures, usually with Andrei Averin, Zurab Matua and Dmitry Sorokin, as well as with other members of the Comedy Club. Since the year 2009.
 Dmitry Grachov - miniatures, mostly parodies Vladimir Putin. Usually with Dmitry Sorokin, Zurab Matua, Andrey Averin, Garik Martirosyan, Garik Kharlamov and Timur Batrutdinov. Since 2010.
 Sergey Gorelikov ("Serge Gorely") is a member of the group "United Sexy Boys" (under the pseudonym of Turbo). From 2010 to 2015 and from 2017 leads the rubric "Preliminary caresses". Since May 14, 2010.
 Mikhail Galustyan - miniatures. Appears mainly in special issues as a guest. Since 2010.
 Sergey Mokhnachev ("Sergey Bessmertny") - resident in 2006-2011. 
 Demis Karibidis and Andrey Skorokhod - miniatures. Also in 2013, Karibov led his rubric "Foreign Languages". Karibov - since March 2011, Skorokhod - since 2013.
 The trio "Smirnov, Ivanov, Sobolev" (Ilya Sobolev, Anton "Banderas" Ivanov and Alexei "Smirnyaga" Smirnov) - miniatures. Former members of the "lethal league". Since November 2013.
 Duet "YES!" (Mahmud Huseynov and Magomed Murtazaliev) are miniatures. Winners of Comedy Battle. Since December 2013.
 Ivan Pyshnenko and Dmitry Kozhoma - miniatures, usually with Marina Kravets, Andrei Skorokhod and Demis Karibidis. Since March, 2014.
 Andrey Beburishvili - performances in the genre Stand Up. Winner of Comedy Battle. Since December 2014.
 Eugene Sinyakov - performances in the genre Stand up with a screen. Participant of Comedy Battle. Since December 2015.
 The trio "The Crisis of Genre" (Igor "Gar" Dmitriev, Vasily Zinin, Nikolai Tereshchenko) - miniatures. Participants of the Comedy Battle. Since December 2015.
 The trio "Tommy Lee Jones" (Arthur Dadashev, Islam Kantayev, Ibrahim Baisagurov) - miniatures. Winners of Comedy Battle. Since December 2015.

Groups 

 "Lips" is a singing merry song folk group, founded in 2007 by Timur Batrutdinov, Roman Yunusov, Havre, Garik Kharlamov, Andrei Averin, Dmitry Sorokin and other residents.
 "Jukebox" - Acted in the Comedy Club in 2008, 2010 and 2015.
 "United Sexy Boyz" (abbreviated to "USB") is a band that has been parodying variety music since 2010. The stage image is a group "banned on all TV and radio channels of Russia", allegedly recording an album a week and making clips to it. Also from 2014, besides clips, parody known things like full-length films, television series, commercials, cartoons, fragments of news releases and plots of various TV channels, entries in Internet blogs, video and computer games begin to parody. Clips begin with the phrase Dyushi Metelkin "USB here. Here everything: Nikita, Stas, Gena, Turbo and Dyusha Metolkin. " Members of the group: Nikita (Konstantin Malasayev) - every phrase begins with the words: "And I'm Nikita ...", followed by a joke, usually on a subway / homosexual topic. Gena (Dmitry Vyushkin) - always silent. Stas (Andrey Shelkov) - every phrase begins with the words: "Let me say, yeah ...". Turbo (Sergey Gorelikov) - each phrase begins with the words "Listen, Host!", Often comparing Martirosyan / Volya / Kharlamov with incompatible things and phenomena. Dyusha Metelkin (Andrey Minin) is the leader of the group. Operates style of clothes and behavior of foreign rap artists.
 "The Nest Band." The main part of the group includes: Alexander Nezlobin, Igor "Elvis" Meerson, Marina Kravets, Alexei Smirnov. It was founded in 2010.

Production 
Film crew

Directed by Roman Novikov (2010 – present).

Location

From 2005 to 2017, the filming of the Comedy Club took place at the Golden Palace. In September 2017, the project moved to the Barvikha Luxury Village concert hall, and only test parties remained in the Golden Palace.

Producers

Alexey Lyaporov, Alexey Poymanov, Ilya Romanko, Sergey Mokhnachev. Garik Martirosyan (2005-2017), Tash Sargsyan (2003-2005).

See also 
 The Best Movie
 Our Russia. The Balls of Fate

References

External links 

 
Comedy Club at the Forbes

TNT (Russian TV channel) original programming
Russian comedy television series
2005 Russian television series debuts
2000s Russian television series
2010s Russian television series